Agorius borneensis is an ant-like jumping spider.

Name
The species is named after Borneo, the locality where it is endemic.

References

External links

Encyclopedia of Life

Salticidae
Spiders described in 2001
Spiders of Oceania
Endemic fauna of Borneo